Nina Py Brozovich is a Bolivian climate activist. She founded Fridays For Future in Bolivia. She was a part of the United Nations Youth Climate Summit.

Her work has appeared in Bolivian Express, Pagina Siete, and Fridays for Future weekly. She was a part of the UNICEF "One Generation" campaign. She is a volunteer at La Senda Verde.

References

External links 

 Press – The Global Teach-In (May 26, 2020 globalteachin.com)

Bolivian activists
Year of birth missing (living people)
Living people
Youth climate activists